The Ambassador of Australia to Myanmar is an officer of the Australian Department of Foreign Affairs and Trade and the head of the Embassy of the Commonwealth of Australia to the Republic of the Union of Myanmar. The Ambassador resides in Yangon. 

The position of ambassador has been vacant since April 2022. It was subsequently reported, but not confirmed, that the Department of Foreign Affairs and Trade is considering suspending diplomatic relations with Myanmar as the Australian Government reportedly tries to avoid legitimising the 2021 coup d'état.

List of heads of mission

References

 
Myanmar
Australia